The Women's 75 kg event at the 2010 South American Games had its semifinals held on March 22 and the final on March 27.

Medalists

Results

References
Report

75kg W